Pander may refer to:

People
 Arne Pander (1931–2015), Danish international speedway rider
 Christian Pander (born 1983), a German footballer
 Heinz Christian Pander (1794-1865), Russian biologist and embryologist
 Pier Pander (1864–1919), Dutch sculptor and medal designer
 Pander Brothers, filmmakers and comic book artists Jacob (born 1965) and Arnold Pander (born 1967)

Other uses
 Pander (prostitution), the facilitation or provision of a prostitute in the arrangement of a sex act with a customer
 Pander & Son, a Dutch aircraft company
 Pander Society, an informal organisation for the promotion of the study of conodont palaeontology

See also
Pandering (disambiguation)